José Cano López (23 April 1956 – 25 November 2000), commonly known as Canito, was a Spanish footballer who played during the 1970s and 1980s.

During his professional career, amongst others, the defensive midfielder represented both major teams in Barcelona, Espanyol and FC Barcelona, albeit with little impact at the latter.

Club career
Born in Llavorsí, Lleida, Catalonia, Canito began playing professionally with RCD Espanyol. After serving two loans, at UE Lleida and Cádiz CF, he moved permanently to the first team.

After solid displays in the 1978–79 season, Canito signed with Espanyol's neighbours FC Barcelona. He helped the club win the Copa del Rey in his second year, but was also ostracized following an incident involving main team Espanyol: as the club was fighting to avoid relegation from La Liga against Hércules CF, he was warming up in the sidelines for Barcelona, and celebrated when the Pericos netted the goal which led to salvation, to the fury of the crowd at the Camp Nou.

Canito then returned to his main club as part of the deal that sent goalkeeper Urruti in the opposite direction, but left after only one year after falling out with coach José María Maguregui. He subsequently represented Real Betis, Real Zaragoza and also spent one season in Portugal with C.F. Os Belenenses after which he moved back to his country, retiring in amateur football at the age of 32.

International career
During one of his best club seasons, at Espanyol, Canito picked up his sole cap for Spain: on 21 December 1978, he played the last 20 minutes of the 0–1 friendly defeat with Italy in Rome.

Death
Canito fell into a severe drug addiction after retiring. Even though he was aided psychologically and economically by Barcelona and Espanyol's Veterans Associations, he could not recover, and was found dead in his sister's home in La Pobla de Montornès, Province of Tarragona, on 25 November 2000. He was only 44 years old.

Honours
Barcelona
Copa del Rey: 1980–81

References

External links

1956 births
2000 deaths
Sportspeople from the Province of Lleida
Spanish footballers
Footballers from Catalonia
Association football midfielders
RCD Espanyol footballers
UE Lleida players
Cádiz CF players
FC Barcelona players
Real Betis players
Real Zaragoza players
C.F. Os Belenenses players
La Liga players
Tercera División players
Primeira Liga players
Spain under-21 international footballers
Spain amateur international footballers
Spain B international footballers
Spain international footballers
Spanish expatriate footballers
Spanish expatriate sportspeople in Portugal
Expatriate footballers in Portugal